A duende is a supernatural being in the folklore of Iberia, Latin America and the Philippines.

Duende or duendes may also refer to:

Art, entertainment, and media

Literature
 El Duende, an 1821 Dominican newspaper

Music
 "Duende" (art), a Spanish term invoking emotion and authenticity associated with flamenco
 "Duende" (song), a 1997 song by Delerium
 "Duende", a 2005 song by Daryl Braithwaite from Snapshot
 Duendes, a 2008 album by Ivonne Guzmán

Other uses
367943 Duende, a near-Earth asteroid
Duendes Rugby Club, an Argentine rugby union club

See also
 Duende y mysterio del flamenco, or Flamenco, a 1952 documentary film
 Duwende, a similar creature in Filipino mythology